Coleophora alniella is a moth of the family Coleophoridae. It is found in the United States, including Maryland and Virginia.

The larvae feed on the leaves of Alnus species. They create a spatulate leaf case.

References

alniella
Moths described in 1914
Moths of North America